They Could Have Been Bigger Than the Beatles is the third album by English punk rock/new wave band Television Personalities.

In 2011, it was included in NME's "The 100 Greatest Albums You've Never Heard" list. It was chosen by Andrew VanWyngarden of MGMT.

Track listing
All tracks composed by Daniel Treacy; except where indicated
Side A
"Three Wishes" - (05:22)
"David Hockney's Diary" - (02:51)
"In a Perfumed Garden" - (03:49)
"Flowers for Abigail" - (03:36)
"King and Country" - (06:07)
"The Boy in the Paisley Shirt" - (03:50)
"Games for Boys" - (02:38)
Side B
"Painter Man" (Eddie Phillips, Kenny Pickett) - (02:44)
"Psychedelic Holiday" - (03:15)
"14th Floor" - (02:20)
"Sooty's Disco Party" - (02:22)
"Makin' Time" (Eddie Phillips, Kenny Pickett) - (02:52)
"When Emily Cries" - (04:18)
"The Glittering Prizes" - (03:13)
"Anxiety Block" - (03:07)
"Mysterious Ways" - (05:09)

References

1982 albums
Television Personalities albums
Fire Records (UK) albums